Jalalabad is a neighbourhood  of North Nazimabad Town in  Karachi, Sindh, Pakistan.

There are several ethnic groups including Muhajirs, Sindhis, Punjabis, Kashmiris, Seraikis, Pakhtuns, Balochis, Memons, Bohras and Ismailis. Over 99% of the population is Muslim. Pakhtun community predominates this neighbourhood.

References

Neighbourhoods of Karachi